Emmanuel Eloundou (born 13 March 1948) is a Cameroonian boxer. He competed in the men's featherweight event at the 1972 Summer Olympics. At the 1972 Summer Olympics, he lost to José Baptista of Venezuela.

References

1948 births
Living people
Cameroonian male boxers
Olympic boxers of Cameroon
Boxers at the 1972 Summer Olympics
Place of birth missing (living people)
Featherweight boxers
20th-century Cameroonian people